Juuni Senshi Bakuretsu Eto Ranger was originally made in Japan by Shaft. 39 episodes aired from 7 April 1995 to 26 January 1996 on TV Tokyo.

References

External links
 (anime) at Anime News Network's encyclopedia

Lists of anime episodes
Lists of Japanese television series episodes